The demolition of monuments to Vladimir Lenin in Ukraine started during the fall of the Soviet Union and continued to a small extent throughout the 1990s, mostly in some western Ukrainian towns, though by 2013 most Lenin statues in Ukraine remained standing. During Euromaidan in 2013–2014, the destruction of statues of Lenin become a widespread phenomenon and became popularly known in Ukraine as Leninopad (Ukrainian: Ленінопад, Russian: Ленинопад), a pun literally translated as "Leninfall", with the coinage of "-пад" being akin to English words suffixed with "fall" as in "waterfall", "snowfall", etc.

History 

 
The demolition of Lenin monuments in Ukraine happened in four stages. During the 1990s, more than 2,000 Lenin monuments were demolished in Galicia and Volyn, at the turn of the 1990–2000s more than 600 Lenin monuments were removed in western and central areas, in 2005–2008, more than 600 were demolished mainly in central areas, and in 2013–2014, 552 monuments were demolished.

The first wave of demolitions of Lenin monuments happened in Western Ukraine in 1990–1991. On 1 August 1990, in Chervonohrad a Lenin monument was demolished for the first time in the USSR. Under popular pressure the monument was dismantled, formally with the purpose of moving elsewhere. That same year, Lenin monuments were dismantled in Ternopil, Kolomyia, Nadvirna, Borislav, Drohobych, Lviv and other cities of Galicia.

In 1991, Ukraine had 5,500 Lenin monuments. In November 2015, approximately 1,300 Lenin monuments were still standing. More than 700 Lenin monuments were removed and/or destroyed between February 2014 and December 2015.

On 9 April 2015, the Ukrainian parliament passed legislation on decommunization. On 15 May 2015, President of Ukraine Petro Poroshenko signed this bill into law that started a six-month period for the removal of communist monuments (excluding World War II monuments) and the mandatory renaming of settlements with names related to Communism. On 16 January 2017, the Ukrainian Institute of National Remembrance announced that 1,320 Lenin monuments were dismantled during decommunization.

A website "Raining Lenins" tracks the statistics of the fall of Lenin statues in Ukraine.

On 17 March 2016, the largest Lenin monument at the unoccupied territory of Ukraine, 19.8 meters high, was dismantled in Zaporizhia. In between the annexation of the Crimean Peninsula by the Russian Federation and 28 September 2014, the largest Lenin monument at the unoccupied territory was standing in Kharkiv (20.2 m high). This statue of Lenin in Kharkiv was toppled and destroyed on 28 September 2014.

During the 2022 Russian invasion of Ukraine, many of these statues of Lenin, which had been taken down by Ukrainian activists, were re-erected by Russian occupiers in Russian-controlled areas.

Motivation 
The start of the "Leninopad" in its mass was laid by the demolition of the Lenin monument in Kyiv on the Bessarabian Square. The event took place on 8 December 2013 at around 6:00 pm. Even more people began to massively destroy monuments of the Soviet past after reports about the Euromaidan activists who died during the protests in Kyiv.

In January 2015, the Ministry of Culture of Ukraine announced that it would encourage all public initiatives related to cleaning Ukraine of monuments to figures of the communist past. According to Minister Vyacheslav Kyrylenko, his department will initiate the removal from the State Register of Immovable Monuments of Ukraine of all monuments related to communist figures listed there. "The state will not oppose, but on the contrary, will in every possible way support all public initiatives that will fight for the cleansing of Ukraine from these relics of the totalitarian past," the minister emphasized.

In April 2015, the Verkhovna Rada of Ukraine voted in favor of the draft law "On the condemnation of the communist and national socialist (Nazi) totalitarian regimes in Ukraine and the prohibition of propaganda of their symbols", which, in particular, will oblige local authorities to dismantle monuments to communist figures on the territory of Ukraine.

Communist monuments toppled during Euromaidan 

Euromaidan protesters toppled several statues of Vladimir Lenin in Ukrainian cities. Some estimates said that more than 90 statues were toppled. In December 2015, The Ukrainian Week calculated that 376 Lenin monuments were removed or destroyed in February 2014.

This is a partial list:

Reactions 
The removal of the monuments evoked mixed feelings among the Ukrainian population. In some cases, like in Kharkiv in early 2014, pro-Russian Ukrainian crowds protected the monuments, including members of the communist and socialist parties, as well as veterans of World War II and the Afghan wars. The Statue of Lenin in Kharkiv was toppled on 28 September 2014. Late October 2014, then Kharkiv Governor Ihor Baluta admitted that he thought that the majority of Kharkiv residents had not wanted the statue removed, but said "there was hardly any protest afterward either, which is quite telling".

In January 2015, the Ministry of Culture of Ukraine announced that it would encourage any public initiatives related to the cleansing of Ukraine from monuments to figures of the totalitarian communist past.

See also 
 List of statues of Vladimir Lenin
 List of communist monuments in Ukraine
 Decommunization in Ukraine
 Derussification in Ukraine
 Lustration in Ukraine
 Demolition of monuments to Alexander Pushkin in Ukraine
 Removal of Confederate monuments and memorials

References

External links 

 Map and lists of damaged monuments
 Raining Lenins

Bibliography 
 
 
 

Euromaidan
Destroyed sculptures
Statues in Ukraine
Demolished buildings and structures in Ukraine
Anti-communism in Ukraine
2013 in Ukraine
2014 in Ukraine
Decommunization in Ukraine
Lenin, Vladimir in Ukraine
Derussification
Decolonization
Anti-Soviet resistance
Monuments and memorials to Vladimir Lenin